Lucile Emina Hadžihalilović  (born 7 May 1961) is a French writer and director of Bosnian descent.  She is best known for the 1996 short film La Bouche de Jean-Pierre and the 2004 feature-length film Innocence, for which she became the first woman to win the Stockholm International Film Festival annual Bronze Horse top award for best film.

Background
Hadžihalilović was born in Lyon in 1961 to Bosnian Yugoslav parents and grew up in Morocco until she was 17. She studied art history and graduated from the prestigious French film school La Femis (previously Institut des hautes études cinématographiques) in 1987 with the short film La Premiere Mort de Nono.

In the early 1990s, she began to collaborate with the notable French filmmaker Gaspar Noé. She produced and edited his short film Carne (1991) and its sequel, the feature-length I Stand Alone (1998), and together they formed the production company Les Cinémas de la Zone in 1991. Noe explained their coming together as business partners: "we discovered that we shared a desire to make films atypical and we decided together to create our own society, Les Cinémas de la Zone, in order to finance our projects." Hadžihalilović's first film after her graduation, La Bouche de Jean-Pierre (1996), was a result of this collaborative effort. Hadžihalilović wrote, edited, produced, and directed the film while Noé worked as the cinematographer. La Bouche de Jean-Pierre was shown during the Un Certain Regard panel at the Cannes Film Festival as well as being selected for various other notable festivals throughout the world. Hadžihalilović also contributed to the screenplay of Noe's critically divisive Enter the Void (2009), and continued as a producer of Lux Æterna (2019) and Vortex (2021).

Career

Editor
Hadžihalilović worked as an editor for a number of films before beginning her own projects. The first film she worked on was Sylvain Ledey's short Festin (1986), after which she edited Alain Bourges' 1991 documentary Horizons artificiels (Trois rêves d'architecture), which has been described as "three confrontations between the discourse on architecture and the architecture of speech." Soon after, she had begun her collaboration with Gaspar Noé and worked on his 1991 short Carne. In 1994, she worked on the short La Baigneuse by Joel Leberre. Hadžihalilović then both produced and edited Noe's feature-length sequel to Carne, 1998's I Stand Alone.

Director
Hadžihalilović's first short feature after her graduating film was La Bouche de Jean-Pierre (1996). It is told through the eyes of a young girl, Mimi (Sandra Sammartino), whose mother had attempted suicide. Mimi is then relocated to live with her aunt (Denise Aron-Schropfer) and a man named Jean-Pierre (Michel Trillot). The film features child abuse, and ends with Mimi taking sleeping pills in an effort to copy her mother.

In 1998, Hadžihalilović made Good Boys Use Condoms, one of a series of erotic short films promoting condom use. Another in the series, Sodomites, was made by Noé. In 2004, she released the critically acclaimed film Innocence, starring Marion Cotillard and Hélène de Fougerolles. The film was inspired by the 1903 novella Mine-Haha, or On the Bodily Education of Young Girls by German playwright Frank Wedekind. The film follows three young girls who attend a secluded mysterious boarding school and their interactions with their teachers (Cotillard and Fougerolles). She has commented on the film's similarity or references to Peter Weir's Picnic at Hanging Rock (1975), Dario Argento's Suspiria (1977), and Victor Erice's The Spirit of the Beehive (1973).

Hadžihalilović released a short entitled Nectar in 2014 and the feature film Evolution in 2015. Evolution revolves around young boys who are subjected to mysterious treatments and live on an island inhabited solely by women and themselves.

Hadžihalilović released her first English-language feature in 2021 called Earwig, about a girl whose teeth are made of ice, which won Special Jury Prize at San Sebastian Film Festival.

Awards
 Stockholm International Film Festival – Bronze Horse – 2004 / Innocence

Filmography

References

External links

Les Gens du Cinema

1961 births
Living people
French people of Bosnia and Herzegovina descent
French women film directors
Mass media people from Lyon
French women screenwriters
French screenwriters
French-language film directors